Anku (Quechua for tendon, nerve, slim (person), elastic, flexible, Hispanicized spelling Ango) is an archaeological site in Peru. The site was declared a National Cultural Heritage by Resolución Directoral No. 533/INC on June 18, 2002.

See also 
Isog
Piruro
Susupillo
Huankarán

References 

Archaeological sites in Huánuco Region
Archaeological sites in Peru